Thomas Klikauer (born 20 July 1962 in Darmstadt/ Germany) is a Senior lecturer teaching Human resource management and Industrial Relations at the Sydney Graduate School of Management (SGSM) at the Western Sydney University, Australia.
He holds MAs from the United States and Germany and a PhD from Warwick University, UK.
His research into the motor vehicle and shipping industry (e.g. ) led to several books focusing on Communication, and Management at Work, Management Communication, Communicative Ethics and Action. His current interest is in ethics at work and management.

Education 
Finishing elementary school, he entered into an apprenticeship to graduate with an engineering degree as toolmaker. Upon re-entering school, he graduated from The University of Applied Science in Darmstadt (BA) to move on to Technical University of Darmstadt and to Bremen University holding a master's degree in Political Science. He also holds a Master of Political Science from Boston University. He was awarded a PhD at the University of Warwick (UK) in Industrial and Business Studies.

Publications

Books 
 2015. Hegel’s Moral Corporation, Basingstoke: Palgrave  
 2014. Seven HRM Moralities, Basingstoke: Palgrave.  
 2013. Managerialism – A Critique of an Ideology, Basingstoke: Palgrave.  
 2012. Seven Management Moralities, Basingstoke: Palgrave.  
 2011. Exploitation Under the Guise of Intellectual Freedom: The Ethics of Getting Other People to Do Your Work, Basingstoke: Palgrave 
 2010. Critical Management Ethics, Basingstoke: Palgrave.  
 2008. Management Communication, Basingstoke: Palgrave.  
 2007. Communication and Management at Work, Basingstoke: Palgrave.

References

External links 
http://www.uws.edu.au/staff_profiles/uws_profiles/doctor_thomas_klikauer
http://www.palgrave.com/products/title.aspx?pid=550680 
http://us.macmillan.com/communicationandmanagementatwork/ThomasKlikauer

1962 births
Living people
Academic staff of Western Sydney University